Bolshaya Chernigovka is a rural locality (a selo) and the administrative center of Bolshechernigovsky District, Samara Oblast, Russia. Population:  It takes its name from the Ukrainian city Chernihiv.

References

Notes

Sources

Rural localities in Samara Oblast